Radu Vodă may refer to:

 Negru Vodă, a 13th-century voivode of Wallachia (Romania)
 Radu Vodă, a village in Lupșanu Commune, Călăraşi County
 Radu Vodă, a village in Izvoarele Commune, Giurgiu County
 Radu Vodă Monastery in Bucharest, Romania